George Boyle Hanna Currie MBE (19 December 1905 – 20 January 1978) was a Northern Irish barrister and politician.

Currie went to Campbell College, Belfast, followed by Trinity College Dublin where he earned the degrees of Bachelor of Arts, Master of Arts, and Bachelor of Laws. He was called to the English Bar by the Middle Temple in 1932, and practiced on the Northern circuit based in Liverpool.

With an interest in politics, Currie was elected to Wirral County Borough Council and served as Chairman of the Council in 1938–39. During the Second World War he served with the Royal Air Force Volunteer Reserve and was on the staff of Lord Dowding at RAF Fighter Command, later switching to the legal branch.

At the 1950 general election Currie fought as Conservative candidate for East Flintshire, a safe Labour seat. He fought this seat again in the 1951 election.

He was then selected for North Down where the sitting Ulster Unionist MP Patricia Ford was retiring after only two years. He won the seat in May 1955 and on 19 December made his maiden speech in a debate on the White Fish Subsidy (United Kingdom) No. 2 Scheme.

Currie easily kept the seat which he represented for fifteen years before himself retiring at the 1970 general election. His successor was James Kilfedder former West Belfast MP.

References
 Obituary, "The Times", 24 January 1978.
 

1905 births
1978 deaths
Members of the Parliament of the United Kingdom for County Down constituencies (since 1922)
Ulster Unionist Party members of the House of Commons of the United Kingdom
People educated at Campbell College
UK MPs 1955–1959
UK MPs 1959–1964
UK MPs 1964–1966
UK MPs 1966–1970
Royal Air Force Volunteer Reserve personnel of World War II
Members of the Middle Temple
20th-century British lawyers